The 244th Infantry Division was a division of the German Army in World War II.

In 1944, the division was in southern France, and fought against the Western Allies in Operation Dragoon until August 28, when it surrendered at Marseille.

Order of Battle 1944
932nd Grenadier Regiment (four battalions)
933rd Grenadier Regiment (three battalions)
234th Grenadier Regiment (three battalions)
244th Artillery Regiment (three battalions)
244th Panzerjäger Battalion
244th Reconnaissance Battalion
244th Pioneer Battalion
244th Signals Battalion
244th Division Support Units

References

Infantry divisions of Germany during World War II
Military units and formations established in 1944
Military units and formations disestablished in 1944